Johan (Juho) Alfred Heikkinen (20 July 1863 - 5 July 1938) was a Finnish farmer and politician, born in Oulu. He was a member of the Parliament of Finland from 1907 to 1911 and again from 1917 to 1922, representing the Agrarian League.

References

1863 births
1938 deaths
People from Oulu
People from Oulu Province (Grand Duchy of Finland)
Finnish Lutherans
Centre Party (Finland) politicians
Members of the Parliament of Finland (1907–08)
Members of the Parliament of Finland (1908–09)
Members of the Parliament of Finland (1909–10)
Members of the Parliament of Finland (1910–11)
Members of the Parliament of Finland (1917–19)
Members of the Parliament of Finland (1919–22)
People of the Finnish Civil War (White side)
Finnish farmers